Kent RO Systems is an Indian healthcare products company headquartered in Noida, Uttar Pradesh. It makes water purifiers based on the process of reverse osmosis purification.

Over the years the company has diversified into other products such as air purifiers, vacuum cleaners, vegetable and fruit purifiers as well as water softeners. The company exports to SAARC countries, Middle East, Africa, Asia and Europe. It expects a contribution of 15% of total turnover to come from exports in the near future. The company won the Golden Peacock Eco Innovation Award for its contribution in developing innovative water purifying technology and preventing environment degradation in 2007. In 2019,  Kent RO Systems received the best domestic water purifier award at the Water Digest Water Awards organized at the Lalit, New Delhi.

Facility 

Kent has its manufacturing base in Roorkee (Uttarakhand) which is spread across 400,000 sq. ft and has an annual capacity of 1 million units. Its technology is validated by UNESCO and certified by other organizations such as NSF, WQA, TUV and ISO but some are made in China .

Turnover 

Kent sells more than 225,000 reverse osmosis purifiers every year and holds around 40% market share in India. Its annual turnover in 2010 was ₹250 crore. Kent sold about 4,500,000; unit in 2015. About 80% of its revenues are from its reverse osmosis purifiers. The company has sold over a million units to date

In Aug 2020, Kent annual turnover in 2020 was 1200 crore, with 20% of growth rate..

References

External links

Health care companies of India
Manufacturing companies based in Noida
Indian brands
Home appliance brands
1999 establishments in Uttar Pradesh
Indian companies established in 1999